Lázaro Vinícius Alves Martins (born 28 June 1990), or Lázaro is a Brazilian professional footballer who plays for Al-Jabalain as a centre-back.

Career
Born in Minas Gerais, he began his career in football acting for the basic categories of Atlético Mineiro. In 2007, he competed in the U-17 World Championship for the Brazilian National Team. He left Brazil at the age of 18 and went to SC Heerenveen in the Netherlands.

In the years 2013 and 2014 he worked for the Manama Club in Bahrain. On July 8, 2014, with the departure of Adalberto, Lázaro was contracted by America of Christmas.

In 2015, the defender defended the Inter of Lages in the dispute of Series A of Championship Santa Catarina.

References

External links
 

1990 births
Living people
Brazilian footballers
Brazil international footballers
SC Heerenveen players
FC Emmen players
Alagoinhas Atlético Clube players
Vila Nova Futebol Clube players
Paulista Futebol Clube players
Boa Esporte Clube players
Manama Club players
América Futebol Clube (RN) players
Esporte Clube Internacional de Lages players
Luverdense Esporte Clube players
Terengganu FC players
Clube Atlético Bragantino players
Clube de Regatas Brasil players
Operário Ferroviário Esporte Clube players
Hajer FC players
Al-Jabalain FC players
Eerste Divisie players
Campeonato Brasileiro Série B players
Campeonato Brasileiro Série C players
Malaysia Super League players
Saudi First Division League players
Brazilian expatriate footballers
Brazilian expatriate sportspeople in the Netherlands
Brazilian expatriate sportspeople in Bahrain
Brazilian expatriate sportspeople in Malaysia
Brazilian expatriate sportspeople in Saudi Arabia
Expatriate footballers in the Netherlands
Expatriate footballers in Bahrain
Expatriate footballers in Malaysia
Expatriate footballers in Saudi Arabia
Sportspeople from Minas Gerais
Association football central defenders